Gustav Berggren (born 7 September 1997) is a Swedish professional footballer who plays as a midfielder for Ekstraklasa club Raków Częstochowa.

Club career 
On 29 July 2022, Berggren signed a three-year contract with Polish side Raków Częstochowa.

International career 
Berggren made his debut for the Sweden national team on 9 January 2020 in a friendly game against Moldova.

Honours 
BK Häcken

 Allsvenskan: 2022

References

External links 
 

1997 births
Living people
Association football midfielders
Swedish footballers
Sweden youth international footballers
Sweden international footballers
Allsvenskan players
Superettan players
Ekstraklasa players
BK Häcken players
Varbergs BoIS players
Raków Częstochowa players
Swedish expatriate footballers
Expatriate footballers in Poland
Swedish expatriate sportspeople in Poland